Ustya may refer to:

Ustya, Russia, alternative name of several rural localities in Moscow Oblast, Russia
Ustya (river), a stream in Arkhangelsk Oblast of Russia
Ustya, a diminutive of the Russian female first name Avgusta
Ustya, a diminutive of the Russian male first name Avgustin
Ustya, a diminutive of the Russian female first name Avgustina

See also
Ustia (disambiguation)
Ustye, several rural localities in Russia
Ustyansky District, a district of Arkhangelsk Oblast, Russia